Halipteridae is a family of corals belonging to the order Pennatulacea.

Genera:
 Halipteris Kölliker, 1869

References

Pennatulacea
Cnidarian families